The Varman dynasty (350–650) was the first historical dynasty of the Kamarupa kingdom. It was established by Pushyavarman, a contemporary of Samudragupta. The earlier Varmans were subordinates of the Gupta Empire, but as the power of the Guptas waned, Mahendravarman (470–494) performed two horse sacrifices and the status of Kamarupa as independent state remained umimpaired. According to the Allahabad Prasasti, the ruler of Kamarupa was a frontier ruler (Pratyanta-nrpatis) of the great Gupta emperor.

As per the Apsad Inscription of Adityasen, Susthivarman was defeated by Mahasengupta on the bank of Lauhitya.

The first of the three Kamarupa dynasties, the Varmans were followed by the Mlechchha and then the Pala dynasties.

Capital
The capital was moved at least once, the last time by Sthitavarman (566-590) with the older city not named but presumed to be Pragjyotishpura, located at the south-eastern slope of the Narakasur hill near Dispur.  The new capital was possibly some location in Guwahati. Though the claim is not supported by any archaeological findings.

Origins
Kamarupa is first mentioned on Samudragupta's Allahabad rock pillar as a frontier kingdom, began as a subordinate but sovereign ally of the Gupta empire around present-day Guwahati in the 4th century:

The first king in this dynasty was Pushyavarman, possibly a contemporary of Samudragupta (c. 335/350-375 CE).  The kingdom which he established with much effort, grew in the periphery of the Gupta Empire, adopted the north Indian political model, and its kings took on names and titles of the Gupta kings and queens. Nothing much is known directly about the initial kings till the sixth king, Mahendravarman, who established a rock temple and assumed the title of Maharajadhiraja (king-of-kings) in the last quarter of the fifth century. The dynastic line from Pushyavarman first appear in the 7th century, in Dubi and Nidhanpur copperplate inscriptions issued by Bhaskaravarman and in the Harshacharita and not earlier in any inscription from his ancestors. In these inscriptions Bhaskaravarman claims that he was a descendant of Narakasur, Bhagadatta and Vajradatta. Modern scholars consider this claim to be a fabrication— suggests that this genealogy was created in the context of Bharkarvarman's alliance with Harshavardhana, to help legitimise his sovereignty.  The use of Naraka/Bhagadatta lineage to establish sovereignty continued under the Mlechchha and the Pala dynasties, a practice which is in keeping with the trend in the post-Gupta period in India.

Foreign records are conflicting, with Xuanzang claiming him to be a Brahmana and She-Kia-Fang-Che claiming him to be a kshatriya whose ancestors came from China. Though some modern scholars have opined that the Varman dynasty is probably of Indo-Aryan descent, it is now believed that the Varmans were originally non-Indo-Aryans. Suniti Kumar Chatterjee calls Bhaskaravarman a Hinduised Mlechcha king of Indo-Mongoloid origin. Hugh B. Urban also infers that the Varmans descended from non-Aryan tribes.

Politics and diplomacy
The Varman's modeled themselves after the Gupta's and named themselves after the Gupta kings and queens.

Cultural environment
The Buddhist scholar Xuanzang described his impressions of the people of the country: The manners of the people simple and honest. The men are of small stature, and their complexion a dark yellow. Their language differs a little from that of Mid-India. Their nature is very impetuous and wild; their memories are retentive, and they are earnest in study. They adore and sacrifice to the Dêvas, and have no faith in Buddha; hence from the time when Buddha appeared in the world even down to the present time there never as yet has been built one sanghårama as a place for the priests to assemble. Such disciples as there are of a pure faith, say their prayers (repeat the name of Buddha) secretly, and that is all. There are as many as 100 Dêva temples, and different sectaries to the number of several myriads... The king is fond of learning, and the people are so likewise in imitation of him. Men of high talent from distant regions aspiring after office visit his dominions as strangers. Though he has no faith in Buddha, yet he much respects Śramaṇas of learning."

The dynasty
The dynastic line, as given in the Dubi and Nidhanpur copperplate inscriptions:

References

Bibliography

 

 
 

 
 
 
 
 
 

 
People from Kamarupa
Kamarupa (former kingdom)